Harold "Hal" James Jones (22 December 1907 – 16 October 1955) was a Welsh rugby union, and professional rugby league footballer who played in the 1920s and 1930s.

Background
Hal Jones was born in Ogmore Vale, Wales, he and his wife; Ida were the landlord, and landlady of The Goat public house in Steeton, West Riding of Yorkshire, England, and he died aged 47 in Staincliffe, Batley, West Riding of Yorkshire.

Playing career

Rugby league career
Harold Jones made his début for Wigan in the 7–8 defeat by Leigh at Mather Lane (adjacent to the Bridgewater Canal), Leigh on Saturday 31 August 1929, he scored his first try for Wigan in the 23–6 victory over Wakefield Trinity at Central Park, Wigan on Wednesday 1 January 1930, he scored his last try for Wigan in the 15–8 victory over Widnes at Naughton Park, Widnes on Saturday 4 March 1933, he played his last match for Wigan in the 10–11 defeat by Halifax at Thrum Hall, Halifax on Saturday 11 November 1933. and played right-, i.e. number 10, in Keighley's 5-18 defeat by Widnes in the 1937 Challenge Cup Final during the 1936-37 season at Wembley Stadium, London on Saturday 8 May 1937, in front of a crowd of 47,699.

International honours
Hal Jones won caps for Wales (RU) while at Neath RFC in 1929 against England, and Scotland. Jones also won three caps for Wales (RL) in 1935–1936 while at Keighley.

Harold Jones was selected for Great Britain while at Keighley for the 1936 Great Britain Lions tour of Australia and New Zealand but did not play in any of the test matches, although he did play in some of the games against representative sides.

Honoured at Keighley
Harold Jones is a Keighley Cougars Hall of Fame Inductee.

References

External links

1907 births
1955 deaths
Glamorgan Police officers
Cardiff RFC players
Glamorgan County RFC players
Glamorgan Police RFC players
Keighley Cougars players
Maesteg RFC players
Neath RFC players
Publicans
Rugby league players from Bridgend County Borough
Rugby league props
Rugby league second-rows
Rugby union locks
Rugby union players from Bridgend County Borough
Wales international rugby union players
Wales national rugby league team players
Welsh police officers
Welsh rugby league players
Welsh rugby union players
Wigan Warriors players